The gwyllgi (compound noun of either gwyllt "wild" or gwyll "twilight" + ci "dog") is a mythical dog from Wales that appears as a frightful apparition of a mastiff or Black Wolf (similar to a Dire wolf) with baleful breath and blazing red eyes. It is the Welsh incarnation of the black dog figure of English folklore.

Alternate names
The Gwyllgi are also called Cwn Annwfn or Cwn Annwn (meaning "dogs of the otherworld") and Cwn Cyrff ("corpse dog").

Reported sightings
There have been many sighting of this beast in the north east of Wales. Specifically, the Nant y Garth pass located near Llandegla in Denbighshire. It has even been spotted as far away as Marchwiel in Wrexham and as to this day there are still many sightings of this fearsome creature.

Popular culture

In Blood of the Earth, by Faith Hunter, many members of the local cult-like church have been turned into gwyllgi and capture the main character, Nell.

In The Beginner's Guide to Necromancy series by Hailey Edwards, a gwyllgi named Hood is one of the watchmen who guards the Faraday, a high-end condominium where Linus lives. His friend, Lethe, becomes close friends with the main character. Her brother is the Beta of the pack in Atlanta.

See also
Black dog (ghost)
Black Shuck
Cŵn Annwn
Gytrash

References

External links
 Dogs of Darkness, BBC Wales

Mythological dogs
Welsh mythology
Welsh legendary creatures